Maria Caraher (born 1968 or 1969) is an Irish republican activist, school principal and former politician.

Life
Born in Cullyhanna, County Armagh, Northern Ireland to a republican family, she joined Sinn Féin, as did her brothers Michael and Fergal.  Fergal was killed in disputed circumstances at a Royal Marines checkpoint in 1990, while Michael was convicted of involvement in the South Armagh Sniper group of the Provisional Irish Republican Army, which killed seven British soldiers and two police officers.  

In 1996, Caraher was elected to the Northern Ireland Forum in Newry and Armagh, but she did not stand in the subsequent 1998 Northern Ireland Assembly election.

In 1999, Caraher went on a speaking tour of the United States as a representative of the South Amargh Farmers and Residents Committee.

Caraher was principal of Bunscoil an Iúir, an Irish language school in Newry,  leaving the role in June 2018.

References

1968 births
Living people
Members of the Northern Ireland Forum
Schoolteachers from Northern Ireland
Sinn Féin politicians
Politicians from County Armagh